Vladimirovka is a rural locality (a khutor) in Dalnepolubyanskoye Rural Settlement, Ostrogozhsky District, Voronezh Oblast, Russia. The population was 152 in 2010. There are four streets.

Geography 
Dalnyaya Polubyanka is the nearest rural locality.

References 

Rural localities in Ostrogozhsky District